Real freedom is a term coined by the political philosopher and economist Philippe Van Parijs. It expands upon notions of negative freedom by incorporating not simply institutional or other constraints on a person's choices, but also the requirements of physical reality, resources and personal capacity. To have real freedom, according to Van Parijs, an individual must:

1. not be prevented from acting on their will (i.e. they must have traditional negative freedom)
2. possess the resources or capacities actually to carry out their will.

Under this conception, a moral agent could be negatively free to take a holiday in Miami, because no-one is forcing them not to (condition 1 is met); but not really free to do so, because they cannot afford the flight (condition 2 is not met). Similarly, someone could be negatively free to swim across the English Channel; but not really free, because they are not a good enough swimmer and would not be able to succeed in the task. Real freedom is, then, a matter of degree — one is more or less really free, not just either really free or not; and no-one has complete real freedom yet — no-one is currently really free to teleport to Mars, for instance.

Real freedom expands on negative freedom by adding the idea of actually being able to exercise a capacity or resource in the absence of constraint; but does not go as far as some ideas of positive freedom, by refraining from appeal to self-government by a real, best, or higher self.

Politics

Van Parijs uses the concept of real freedom as part of his influential argument for a universal basic income.

Thelema asserts a similar belief that all have right to live, die, think, move, eat, drink, create, and love as they will, and "every person has the absolute and equal right to accomplish their Wills." “The Law is for all,” (Liber AL vel Legis I:34).

See also
Basic income
Individual freedom
Negative liberty
Positive liberty
Power (social and political)

References

Further reading
Birnbaum, S. (2004). Real Libertarianism, Structural Injustice and the Democratic Ideal. Paper presented at the 10th Conference of Basic Income European Network, Barcelona, 19–20 September 2004. A revised version was presented at the annual meeting of The Swedish Political Science Association, Stockholm, October 7–9, 2004 and included in the USBIG Discussion Paper Series.

Universal basic income
Concepts in political philosophy